Faakhir Mehmood is a Pakistani actor, singer, keyboradist, composer and music producer. He started out his career with the Pakistani musical group Awaz. However, due to conflicts of interest, the band split in 2000 and they all went to become solo artists. The band Awaz also consisted of well known musician Haroon.

Early life and career
Faakhir attended the University of Engineering and Technology, Lahore. During his university years, he met another young singer, Haroon. Together, they formed the band Awaz in 1992. Faakhir joined the band as a keyboardist and Asad Ahmed as a guitarist.

After the band split in 2000, Faakhir embarked on a solo career. Faakhir started working on his album Aatish in July 2000 by releasing his first single in August, a national song "Dil Na Lagay, Pakistan".  After deciding to go solo, Faakhir started work on his debut album, Aatish, which was released in 2002. He followed it up with Sub Tun Sohniyeh in 2003, and Mantra in 2005. 

In Mantra, there is a song called "Jiya Na Jaye", in which Faakhir shares a duet with Indian singer Sunidhi Chauhan. Another song in that album called "Mahi Ve" won two awards at India's Sangeet Natak Akademi Awards. He also performed at that event.

Faakhir's live shows have taken his music to many countries in the world including the United States, Europe, the Middle East and Asia, in addition to all parts of Pakistan.

Faakhir has performed alongside several international contemporaries from Europe including Sukhbir and Stereo Nation to name a few.

In 2015, he was one of the producers who worked on the soundtrack for the Pakistani movie Ho Mann Jahaan.

In 2016, Faakhir served as one of the six music directors for season 9 of Coke Studio Pakistan. His first appearance was in an unplugged version of Nusrat Fateh Ali Khan's "Afreen Afreen". Rahat Fateh Ali Khan and Momina Mustehsan rendered their voices for the song. His second appearance at Coke Studio was in "Dilruba Na Raazi" a Pashto traditional folk song, which he sang along with Zeb Bangash. He appeared with Natasha Khan and performed "Dil Kamla".

In 2017, Faakhir Mehmood made some comments on social issues that were newsworthy and were given news coverage by a major newspaper of Pakistan. In the past, Faakhir has served as the UN Goodwill Ambassador for the World Health Organization.

Awards
 Pride of Performance Award by the President of Pakistan in 2007
 Lux Style Awards : Best Song ("Kabhi Kabhi Pyar Mein") in 2010
 Hum Awards : Best Music Video ("Baliya") Won 
 2015: 3rd Hum Awards: Best Music Single

Discography

Albums
 Aatish (2002)
 Sub Tun Sohniyeh (2003)
 Mantra (2005)
 Jee Chaahey (2011–12) – Memhood's fourth album, it was composed and produced by the singer. The album was recorded at Shani's studio with lyrics by Sabir Zafar and Indian poet Prashant Vasal, and was released through Fire Records.
Track listing
"Allah Karay" (with Mahnoor Baloch Featuring Mikaal Zulfiqar)
 "Atom Bomb"
 "Baylia"
 "Jee Chahay"
 "Kho Jaon" featuring Meera (Veet Miss Super Model Contest Season 3)
 "Maula"
 "Mitti Pao"
 "O Sheeday"
 "Parwah"
 "Shikva"

TV commercials
 Nestle Everyday
Boomer 
Telenor Pakistan
United Bank Limited

Soundtracks
 Ek Wari
 Tum Meri Ho
 Dolly Darling
 Salam Zindagi
Critical reception: S. Rasool of Reviewit.pk said: "Jee Chahay has a number of excellent and heart-touching songs. One among the rest, which is closest to Fakhir's heart, is 'Baylia'. It is a-must-listen song. If you have not heard it yet, do give it a go." Ali Ather of Views Craze wrote, "Although not better than Faakhir's previous works Jee chahay the album composed and produced by Faakhir himself comes out to be a pretty decent effort." Rafay Mehmood of Express Tribune said, "Even though Jee Chahay, which comprises 10 songs, might not come close to his previous offering Mantra, which was released in 2005, it still manages to give the listener some tunes worth humming."

See also
Awaz
Haroon (singer)

References

External links
Faakhir Mehmood on YouTube

1973 births
Living people
University of Engineering and Technology, Lahore alumni
Pakistani rock keyboardists
Awaz members
Pakistani pop singers
Recipients of the Pride of Performance